Luca Serianni (30 October 1947 – 21 July 2022) was an Italian linguist and philologist.

Biography
Serianni was professor of Italian language at Sapienza Università di Roma.

A student of Arrigo Castellani’s, he conducted research about Italian linguistic history from the Middle Ages to the present day.

He authored a reference grammar of the Italian language. Together with Maurizio Trifone he was in charge of the Vocabolario della lingua Italiana Il Devoto-Oli, and with Pietro Trifone he edited Storia della lingua italiana.

He was a member of the Accademia della Crusca, Accademia dei Lincei, Arcadia, and vice-chairman of the Società Dante Alighieri.

In 2002, he was awarded an honorary degree from the University of Valladolid.

He was the director of the journals Studi linguistici italiani (Italian Linguistic Studies) and Studi di lessicografia italiana (Studies of Italian Lexicography).

Main works
Il Turamino, a cura di Luca Serianni, Salerno Editrice, Rome, 1976
Testi pratesi della fine del Dugento e dei primi del Trecento, a cura di Luca Serianni, Accademia della Crusca, Florence, 1977
Norma dei puristi e lingua d'uso nell'Ottocento nella testimonianza del lessicografo romano Tommaso Azzocchi, Accademia della Crusca, Florence, 1981
Grammatica italiana. Suoni, forme, costrutti, in collaborazione con Alberto Castelvecchi, Utet, Turin, 1989
Storia della lingua italiana. Il primo Ottocento, Il Mulino, Bologna, 1989
Saggi di Storia linguistica italiana, Morano, Naples, 1989
Storia della lingua italiana. Il secondo Ottocento, Il Mulino, Bologna, 1990
Storia della lingua italiana, a cura di Luca Serianni e Pietro Trifone, 3 vol., Einaudi, Turin 1993–1994
Italiano. Grammatica, sintassi, dubbi, con Alberto Castelvecchi e un glossario di Giuseppe Patota, Garzanti, collana editoriale Le Garzantine, Milan, 1997
Lezioni di grammatica storica italiana, Bulzoni, Rome, 1998
Introduzione alla lingua poetica italiana, Carocci, Rome, 2001
Viaggiatori, musicisti, poeti. Saggi di storia della lingua italiana, Garzanti, Milan, 2002
Italiani scritti, Il Mulino, Bologna, 2003 (second edition: 2007)
Un treno di sintomi. I medici e le parole: percorsi linguistici nel passato e nel presente, Garzanti, Milan, 2005
Prima lezione di grammatica, Laterza, Rome-Bari, 2006
La lingua poetica italiana, Carocci, Rome, 2008
(con Giuseppe Benedetti), Scritti sui banchi. L'italiano a scuola tra alunni e insegnanti, Rome, Carocci, 2009
 L'ora d'italiano, Rome-Bari, Laterza, 2010

References

External links
 Scheda su Luca Serianni dal sito dell'Accademia della Crusca URL consultato il 2 giugno 2009
 Intervista (in 6 video) a Luca Serianni sull'italiano e su questioni di politica linguistica effettuata nell'Istituto italiano di cultura di Lione il 23 ottobre 2008 URL consultato il 5 settembre 2009

1947 births
2022 deaths
Academic staff of the Sapienza University of Rome
Members of the Lincean Academy
Members of the Academy of Arcadians
Linguists from Italy
Italian philologists
Grammarians of Italian
Grammarians from Italy
People from Rome